Nina Nikolayevna Usatova (born October 1, 1951, Altai Krai) is a Soviet and Russian film and stage actress. People's Artist of Russia (1994).

Biography

She graduated from high school number 30 in Kurgan.

From 1969 to 1973, she tried to enter the Boris Shchukin Theatre Institute at the Vakhtangov Theater. Worked again at cloth factory Red October in Borovsk Kaluga region, as director for the House of Culture and was preparing for the entrance exams.

In 1974 she entered the directing faculty Boris Shchukin Theatre Institute (course Boris Zakhava and Marianna Ter-Zakharova), and graduated in 1979.

After finishing her studies in 1979, Nina went to practice in the city of Kotlas, Arkhangelsk Oblast. She played in the local theater twelve roles. At this time, opened in Leningrad Youth Theatre on the Fontanka, and in 1980, the aspiring actress went there. Played in the performances of Vladimir Malyshitsky and Efim Padve.

In 1989, Nina Usatova joined the troupe of the Leningrad Academic Bolshoi Drama Theater named after M. Gorky, now the Tovstonogov Bolshoi Drama Theater.

The actress made her film debut in 1981, her first role was in the TV movie Where did Fomenko?. Fame came after the role of the mute cook Lidiya Matveyevna in the film The Cold Summer of 1953 (1987).

In 1995, Nina Usatova participated in a series of television commercials under the general title of the Russian project. The actress played a provincial woman who arrived in Moscow and saw her son in the honor guard on Red Square. The phrase "Dima, wave your hand to mama" became popular.

Personal life
Husband – Yuri Guryev, linguist and actor.

Son — Nikolay (born 1988).

Awards 
  Medal of the Order "For Merit to the Fatherland" II degree (5 February 2009) - for outstanding contribution to the development of domestic theatrical art and many years of fruitful activity '
 Medal of Pushkin (2004) 
 People's Artist of Russia (1994) — for his great contribution in the field of theatrical art  
 Laureate of the State Prize of the Russian Federation (2001)
Nika Award in the nomination Best Actress (1995, 1999)
 Winner of the Juno (1996) 
Golden Eagle Award (Russia) in the category Best Actress (2013)
 The winner of the festival of actors movie Constellation (1992)
 Winner of the Golden Aries (1994)
 The winner of the festival of orthodox films Golden Knight (1995)
 The winner of the festival Kinotavr (1995)
 Winner of the IV All-Russian film festival Vivat, Russian Cinema (1998)

Selected filmography
 1981 — Where did Fomenko?
 1982 — Golos
 1984 — My Friend Ivan Lapshin
 1985 — Feat of Odessa
 1987 — Bayka
 1987 — Proshchay, shpana zamoskvoretskaya...
 1987 — The Cold Summer of 1953
 1988 — Fountain
 1991 — Chicha
 1991 — The Chekist
 1992 — See Paris and Die
 1993 — Window to Paris
 1995 — Arrival of a Train
 1995 — A Moslem
 1995 — The Fatal Eggs
 1996 — Russian project  
 1997 — American Bet
 1999 — The Admirer
 1999 — Women's Property
 1999 — Quadrille
 1999 — The Barracks
 1999 — Strastnoy Boulevard
 2001 — Next
 2001 — Savage
 2002 — Law
 2002 — Beyond the wolves
 2002 — Caucasian Roulette
 2003 — Peculiarities of National Politics
 2004 — Poor Nastya
 2005 — The Twelve Chairs
 2005 — The Fall of the Empire (TV)
 2005 — The Case of "Dead Souls" (TV)
 2005 — The Master and Margarita
 2006 — Soviet Park
 2006 — Last Slaughter
 2006 — The Island
 2006 — Wolfhound
 2008 — Kings Can Do Everything
 2009 — God's Smile or The Odessa Story
 2009 — Soundtrack of Passion
 2009 — Pelagia and the White Bulldog
 2009 — The Priest
 2010 — Widow steamer
 2011 — Furtseva
 2013 — Legend № 17
 2013 — The village
 2016 — Flight Crew

References

External links

1951 births
20th-century Russian actresses
21st-century Russian actresses
Living people
Honored Artists of the RSFSR
People's Artists of Russia
Recipients of the Medal of the Order "For Merit to the Fatherland" II class
Recipients of the Medal of Pushkin
Recipients of the Nika Award
State Prize of the Russian Federation laureates
Russian activists against the 2022 Russian invasion of Ukraine
Russian film actresses
Russian stage actresses
Russian television actresses
Russian voice actresses
Soviet film actresses
Soviet stage actresses
Soviet television actresses
Soviet voice actresses